Parliamentary elections were held in Norway on 21 October 1924. The result was a victory for the Conservative Party-Liberal Left Party alliance, which won 54 of the 150 seats in the Storting. To date, this is the last election in which the Labour Party did not receive the most votes or the most seats in the Storting of participating parties.

Results

Seat distribution

References

General elections in Norway
1920s elections in Norway
Norway
Parliamentary
Norway